The women's mass start in the 2014–15 ISU Speed Skating World Cup was contested over six races on six occasions, out of a total of seven World Cup occasions for the season, with the first occasion taking place in Obihiro, Japan, on 14–16 November 2014, and the final occasion taking place in Erfurt, Germany, on 21–22 March 2015. The races were over 16 laps.

The defending champion was Francesca Lollobrigida of Italy. Ivanie Blondin of Canada won the cup. Lollobrigida ended up in sixth place.

Top three

Race medallists

Standings 
Standings as of 22 March 2015 (end of the season).

References 

 
Women mass start